Ferdausi Rahman (born 28 June 1941)  also known as Ferdausi Begum is a Bangladeshi playback singer. She is the daughter of folk singer Abbas Uddin. She sang some popular film songs for Pakistani films also in the 1960s especially working with the music composer Robin Ghosh in film Chakori released in 1967. She was awarded Ekushey Padak in 1977 and Independence Day Award in 1995 by the Government of Bangladesh. In addition, she was awarded the lifetime achievement award of the National Film Award in the year 2015.

Personal life

Rahman had two elder brothers, Justice Mustafa Kamal (died 2015) and singer Mustafa Zaman Abbasi. Her niece, Nashid Kamal, is a singer. Her other nieces who are also singers are Samira Abbasi and Sharmini Abbasi.

Rahman is married to Rezaur Rahman, an engineer and industrialist, since 1966. They have two sons, Rubaiyat Rahman and Razin Rahman.

Career
Rahman participated as a children artiste in radio programs. In 1955, she first sang for the radio as an adult artiste. The first released movie where she sang as a playback singer was Ehtesham's Ei Desh Tomar Amar under the music direction of Khan Ataur Rahman in 1959, followed by Asiya in 1960. One of the music directors of the film Asiya was her father Abbas Uddin.
In 1964, her song was broadcast on the newly established Pakistan Television in erstwhile East Pakistan (now Bangladesh).
Her children's program Esho Gaan Shikhi is a program to teach children about music on Bangladesh Television and the program has been running for 44 years. She is known as Gaaner Khalamoni (Aunt of Song) for this program. NTV has been airing a program of her songs presented by contemporary artistes.

Awards and honors
 Lahore Cine Journalist Awards (1963)
 President's Pride of Performance Award (1965) by the President of Pakistan
 Bangladesh National Film Award for Best Music Director (1976)
 Bachsas Awards (1976)
 Ekushey Padak (1977)
 Independence Day Award (1995)
 Nasiruddin Gold Medal
 A crest as part of the Gunijon Shongbordhona program (2009)
 Lifetime Achievement Award 2008 at the Meril Prothom Alo Awards.

Film songs

Non-film songs

References

Living people
1941 births
20th-century Bangladeshi women singers
20th-century Bangladeshi singers
Bangladeshi Nazrul Geeti singers
Recipients of the Pride of Performance
Recipients of the Ekushey Padak
Recipients of the Independence Day Award
National Film Award (Bangladesh) for Lifetime Achievement recipients
Meril-Prothom Alo Lifetime Achievement Award winners
Best Music Director National Film Award (Bangladesh) winners
Best Female Singer Bachsas Award winners
Women musicians from West Bengal